Bathypurpurata is a genus of incirrate octopus in the family Megaleledonidae from the Antarctic Ocean. The genus has only one species, Bathypurpurata profunda, a small purple octopus which lacks an ink sac and has a single row of suckers and a very large salivary gland. It was described in 2005 from a type specimen caught between the Antarctic Peninsula and the South Shetland Islands.

References

Octopodidae
Cephalopod genera
Monotypic mollusc genera
Fauna of the Southern Ocean